Championship Manager: Season 00/01 is a football managing video game.

Gameplay
Ten more playable leagues were introduced for this version, including Australia, Finland, Greece, Northern Ireland, Russia and Wales. It was also the first version of the game to come with an official data editor - something which has been continued for all subsequent versions.

Release
The Daily Telegraph included a free copy of the game for participants in their Fantasy Football competition.

Reception
Championship Manager: Season 00/01 received a "Platinum" sales award from the Entertainment and Leisure Software Publishers Association (ELSPA), indicating sales of at least 300,000 copies in the United Kingdom.

References

2000 video games
Eidos Interactive games
Windows games
Windows-only games
Video game sequels
Association football management video games
BAFTA winners (video games)
Video games developed in the United Kingdom